Utricularia arcuata is a small, probably annual, carnivorous plant that belongs to the genus Utricularia. It is endemic to India. U. arcuata grows as a terrestrial plant in seasonally wet depressions. It was originally described and published by Robert Wight in 1849.

See also 
 List of Utricularia species

References 

Carnivorous plants of Asia
Flora of India (region)
arcuata